HuskySat-1 is an artificial satellite designed at the University of Washington. It was launched by Cygnus NG-12 from Mid-Atlantic Regional Spaceport Launch Pad 0 on Wallops Island, Virginia to low earth orbit on November 2, 2019. It is a CubeSat, and will demonstrate onboard plasma propulsion and high gain telemetry for low Earth orbit that would be a precursor for an attempt at a larger CubeSat designed for orbital insertion at the Moon. 

The satellite was designed by Husky Satellite Lab, a registered student group, in Johnson Hall, and was controlled from there using three antennae installed on the roof.

A pulsed plasma thruster (PPT) provides propulsion. It is the first PPT to use sulfur as a fuel.

Students at Raisbeck Aviation High School designed an onboard camera.

The satellite will test an experimental 24 GHz data transmitter, after which it will become an amateur radio satellite operated by AMSAT. The high data rate will enable much more data to be transferred during the 9- to 15-minute time windows the satellite is visible from the control station.

HuskySat is the first satellite designed by students in Washington state.

References

External links

Current location of HuskySat-1 at AMSAT

 Student satellites
CubeSats
Spacecraft launched in 2019